The 1955 Baltimore mayoral election saw reelection of Thomas D'Alesandro Jr. to a third consecutive term as mayor.

General election
The general election was held May 3.

Campaign
D'Alesandro faced Republican Samuel Hopkins. Hopkins had served a four-year term in the Maryland House of Delegates, having been elected in 1950.

Results

References

Baltimore mayoral
Mayoral elections in Baltimore
Baltimore